The Indian Computing Olympiad is an annual computer programming competition that selects four participants to represent India at the International Olympiad in Informatics. ICO is conducted by the Indian Association for Research in Computing Science. The competition is held in three stages. For the first stage, students may compete in the Zonal Computing Olympiad (a programming contest), or the Zonal Informatics Olympiad (a paper-based algorithmic test). The following two rounds are the Indian National Olympiad in Informatics and the International Olympiad in Informatics Training Camp.

Stages of competition
Students first attempt the Zonal Informatics Olympiad (ZIO), which is a written paper. Most of the questions can be solved with the use of algorithmic techniques, although logic is usually sufficient. Alternatively, students can attempt the Zonal Computing Olympiad (ZCO), an online programming contest. In 2017, students can attempt both the ZIO and ZCO.

The second round of competition is the Indian National Olympiad in Informatics (INOI), a programming competition round. Students are expected to solve two algorithmic problems in 3 hours in C++. Questions in this round are similar to those in the International Olympiad in Informatics.

Based on results in these competitions, about 30 students are selected for the International Olympiad in Informatics Training Camp, at which students are selected and trained to represent India at the International Olympiad in Informatics. The training camp is usually held at The International School, Bangalore. In 2017, the training camp was held at Chennai Mathematical Institute, Chennai.

Incentives
The top students in the Indian Computing Olympiad receive several incentives for admissions to undergraduate institutions in both India and abroad. A list of some of the incentives in India is as follows:

 Amrita University offers fully funded BTech Honors CSE program for students who perform well in ICO.
 Chennai Mathematical Institute offers direct admission to students selected for IOITC in Class 12.
 IIIT Delhi offers 2 bonus percentile points (considered with JEE Mains Percentile) to students selected for IOITC, and 1 bonus percentile point to students selected for INOI.
 IIIT Hyderabad offers admission via the Olympiad category to students selected for IOITC.

Notable alumni 
Notable alumni (medals at IOI) include Akshat Bubna, Harpreet Singh, Malvika Raj Joshi, Keshav Dhandhania, Kshitij Bansal,  Srijon Mukherjee, Adhiraj Somani, Adhyyan Sekhsaria, Akashnil Dutta, Anish Shankar, Rajat De, Raziman Valapu, Amartya Biswas, Sampriti Panda, Srivatsan Balakrishnan, Ajay Ravindran, Archit Karandikar, Arindam Saha, Arjun Pitchanathan, Arnold Noronha, Indraneel Mukherjee, Ishan Behoora, Kushagra Juneja, Nadeem Moidu, Nihal Pednekar, Nikhil Tadigoppula, Pradeep Mathias, Prashant Vasudevan, Prateek Karandikar, Preyas Popat, Rajarshi Basu, Shreevatsa Rajagopalan, Siddharth Krishna, Sidhant Bansal, Swarnendu Datta, Swarun Kumar, and Tanay Kothari.

External links
 ICO homepage The official ICO (INOI) homepage
 ICO online judge (practice website)
 ICO online community

References

2002 establishments in India
Olympiads in India
Programming contests